Stangeland Gruppen is a construction company based in Norway.

It is the parent company of T. Stangeland Maskin, Stangeland Kran, and TS Eiendom.

History
It was founded by Trygve Stangeland in 1959.

References

Construction and civil engineering companies of Norway
Companies based in Sola, Norway
Construction and civil engineering companies established in 1959
Norwegian companies established in 1959